{|

{{Infobox ship career
|Hide header=
|Ship country=Canada
|Ship flag=
|Ship name=Columbia
|Ship owner=Columbia and Kootenay Steam Navigation Company
|Ship operator=
|Ship registry=
|Ship route=Arrow Lakes
|Ship ordered=
|Ship builder=Joseph Paquet or Alexander Watson<ref>Paquet is named as her builder by Affleck, at 50.  Turner states that Columbia was built "under the direction of" Alexander Watson, who was also the builder of Lytton.</ref>
|Ship original cost=$75,000
|Ship yard number=
|Ship way number=
|Ship laid down= 
|Ship launched=
|Ship built=1891, at Northport, Washington, also known as Little Dalles, Washington
|Ship christened=
|Ship acquired=
|Ship maiden voyage=August 20, 1891
|Ship in service=1891
|Ship out of service=1894
|Ship identification=CAN 126880
|Ship fate=Destroyed by fire
|Ship notes=
}}

|}Columbia was a sternwheel steamboat that ran on the Arrow Lakes in British Columbia from 1891 to 1894.  Columbia should be distinguished from the many other vessels with the same or similar names, including in particular the propeller-driven steamboat  Columbia that ran on the Arrow Lakes for many years.

Before the construction of the Keenleyside Dam in the 1960s, there were two Arrow Lakes, called the upper and lower, which were separated by a stretch of shallow water known as the Narrows. The lakes are part of the Columbia River, which flows into the upper Arrow Lake at Arrowhead, British Columbia, and begins again at the southern end of the lower lake near the towns of Robson and Castlegar. Steamers running on Arrow Lakes typically started from the railheads. In the early 1890s the northern railhead was Revelstoke about  up the Columbia River from Arrowhead, where the transcontinental line of the Canadian Pacific Railway crossed the Columbia. In the south, the Great Northern Railway had reached Little Dalles,  Washington by the 1890s. Rail construction was ongoing however. C.P.R. was building an extension south from Revelstoke along the east side of the Columbia River, which would eventually reach Arrowhead. By 1894 the extension had only gone as far as the town of Wigwam, about halfway between Revelstoke and Arrowhead, which became the northernmost point on the route for Columbia.

Design and constructionColumbia was built in the United States at Little Dalles (now known as Northport) for the Columbia and Kootenay Steam Navigation Company.  The vessel's hull had been built at Portland, Oregon then disassembled into sections and shipped by rail to Northport to be reassembled and launched.  On the Arrow Lakes Columbia was the fifth sternwheeler and the largest ever built up to that time.Downs, Art,  Paddlewheels on the Frontier -- The Story of British Columbia and Yukon Sternwheel Steamers, at 119 and 122, Superior Publishing, Seattle, WA 1972

Operations on Arrow Lakes

Under Captain John C. Gore she made her first trip north from Little Dalles to Robson, British Columbia, on August 20, 1891, leaving at 1:00 p.m. and arriving at Robson between 7:00 and 8:00 p.m.  She left for Revelstoke on August 22, 1891.  The addition of Columbia to the C.K.S.N.'s fleet allowed the company to maintain, with the similarly designed sidewheeler Lytton, twice weekly trips from Revelstoke to Little Dalles.

On one trip north, Columbia's hogchains (the steel cables that keep the lightly built hull of an inland steamboat in shape) parted, causing the ship to become hogged, that is the hull sagged at the bow and the stern.  This would have made the vessel unsafe to use until the hog chains could be repaired and the hull returned to proper shape.

 Construction completed Columbia had entered operations in the summer of 1891 before she was fully complete.  This was done on occasion with steamboats so that they could earn some money during the summer navigation season.  (Navigation on the Arrow Lakes and other parts of the Columbia River system was restricted by ice, low water and other winter conditions.)  During the post-season lay up at Revelstoke in the fall of 1891, Alexander Watson completed Columbia's construction.  He built a new upper row of cabins, called a "Texas" and placed the pilot house (the smaller cabin structure where the ship's wheel was located) on top of the Texas.  Electric lighting was also installed.  These changes made the Columbia the premier vessel operating on the Upper Columbia.  Columbia can be readily distinguished in photographs of the period by her high pilot house.

Loss by fire
On August 2, 1894 Columbia caught fire at a wood yard just north of the international border, at a point about six miles (10 km) south of Trail, British Columbia.  It was believed that the fire was caused by a crewman falling asleep without extinguishing his pipe.  No one was hurt, but Columbia was destroyed.  Insurance paid for $15,000 but the economic cost to the company was still severe, because the mining and rail construction business in the area was booming and every vessel was working at full capacity.

Salvage and replacement
In a typical pattern of salvage, Columbia's engines were retrieved from the wreck and installed in the Kootenay Lake steamer Kokanee.  On the Arrow Lakes, the Columbia and Kootenay Steam Navigation Company replaced Columbia with the Nakusp.

Notes

Further reading
 Faber, Jim, Steamer's Wake—Voyaging down the old marine highways of Puget Sound, British Columbia, and the Columbia River, Enetai Press, Seattle, WA 1985 
 Timmen, Fritz, Blow for the Landing—A Hundred Years of Steam Navigation on the Waters of the West, Caxton Printers, Caldwell, Idaho 

External links
Photos
Columbia and Lytton at Revelstoke, BC  This photograph was probably taken in the summer of 1891, before the Texas cabin structure was built on the top deck of Columbia''.

Steamboats of the Arrow Lakes
Paddle steamers of British Columbia